Talis menetriesi is a moth in the family Crambidae described by George Hampson in 1900. It is found in Mongolia and Irkutsk, Russia.

References

Ancylolomiini
Moths described in 1900
Moths of Asia